Sudan competed at the 2022 World Athletics Championships in Eugene, United States, from July 15 to 24, 2022.

Results
Sudan entered 1 athlete.

Men 
Track and road events

References

External links
Oregon22｜WCH 22｜World Athletics

Nations at the 2022 World Athletics Championships
World Championships in Athletics
Sudan at the World Championships in Athletics